Javon Kinlaw (born 3 October 1997) is a Trinidadian professional American football defensive tackle for the San Francisco 49ers of the National Football League (NFL). He played college football at South Carolina, and was drafted by the 49ers in the first round of the 2020 NFL Draft.

Early years
Kinlaw spent part of his childhood homeless in Washington, D.C. after immigrating from Trinidad and Tobago with his mother and two siblings. He attended Goose Creek High School in Goose Creek, South Carolina.

College career
Kinlaw played one year at Jones County Junior College in 2016 before transferring to the University of South Carolina. In his first year at South Carolina in 2017, he played in all 13 games with 10 starts and had 20 tackles. In 2018, he started all 12 games and had 38 tackles and 4.5 sacks. Kinlaw returned to South Carolina for his senior season in 2019.

Statistics

Professional career 

Kinlaw was drafted by the San Francisco 49ers in the first round of the 2020 NFL Draft with the 14th overall pick. The 14th overall pick was acquired originally from the Tampa Bay Buccaneers after the 49ers traded down with the first round pick (13th overall) they originally acquired in the DeForest Buckner trade. He signed his four-year rookie contract with the team on 26 June 2020, worth a fully guaranteed $15.48 million, including an $8.8 million signing bonus.

During Week 10 against the New Orleans Saints, Kinlaw recorded his first career sack on quarterback Taysom Hill during the 27–13 loss. Kinlaw was placed on the reserve/COVID-19 list by the team on November 18, 2020, and activated on November 27. In Week 12 against the Los Angeles Rams, Kinlaw intercepted a pass thrown by Jared Goff and returned it for a 27-yard touchdown during the 23–20 win. This was his first career interception and touchdown. Kinlaw was named Pepsi Rookie of the Week for his performance against the Rams.

On October 30, 2021, Kinlaw was placed on injured reserve.

On October 15, 2022, Kinlaw was placed on injured reserve. He was activated on December 23.

NFL statistics

References

External links
San Francisco 49ers bio
South Carolina Gamecocks bio

1997 births
Living people
Sportspeople from Charleston, South Carolina
Trinidad and Tobago players of American football
Players of American football from South Carolina
American football defensive tackles
Jones County Bobcats football players
South Carolina Gamecocks football players
San Francisco 49ers players
All-American college football players